Muhammad Abdul Khaleque was a Member of Parliament of Pakistan representing East Bengal.

Career 
Khaleque was elected to parliament from East Pakistan as a Muslim candidate.

References 

Pakistani MNAs 1955–1958